KETO-LP (93.9 FM) is a low-power FM radio station branded as "KETO 93.9 FM".  The station is operated by Ethiopian Community Television broadcasting an international multicultural FM music/News and Podcasts format. This station is licensed to Aurora, Colorado and is broadcasting to the Denver, Colorado area.

References

External links
 

KETO-LP
Radio stations established in 2017
Talk radio stations in the United States
KETO-LP
2017 establishments in Colorado